Hélène Bischler-Causse (January 3, 1932, in Bern – February 12, 2005, in Paris) was a French botanist and bryologist, best known for her research and description of neotropical liverworts, the Marchantiales genera, and plagiochasma. She was the recipient of the P. Bertrand Prize from the French Academy of Sciences in 1974, and the Geneva Sayre Prize from Harvard University in 1985.

References 

1932 births
2005 deaths
French botanists
Women bryologists
Scientists from Bern